Roxy Hotel may refer to the following hotels:

 Roxy Hotel (Cape Vincent), New York, U.S.
 Roxy Hotel, Katong Shopping Centre, Singapore
 Roxy Hotel, formerly based in the Roxy Theatre, Parramatta, Australia